Margarit and Margarita is a 1989 Bulgarian drama film directed by Nikolai Volev. The film was selected as the Bulgarian entry for the Best Foreign Language Film at the 63rd Academy Awards, but was not accepted as a nominee.

Plot
Margarit and Margarita, students in the last grade of high school, love each other. Proud and independent, they often confront their teachers and parents. They leave the school and their homes for the sake of being free. However they enter in a world full of corruption and brutality.

Cast
 Irini Antonios Zampona as Margarita-Rita
 Hristo Shopov as Margarit
 Rashko Mladenov as Yuliyan the choreographer
 Vassil Mihajlov as Nerizanov
 Veselin Vulkov as Yanev, Margarit's father
 Iliya Raev as the school principal
 Tanya Shahova as Kostova, the head teacher

See also
 List of submissions to the 63rd Academy Awards for Best Foreign Language Film
 List of Bulgarian submissions for the Academy Award for Best Foreign Language Film

References

External links
 

1989 films
1989 drama films
Bulgarian drama films
1980s Bulgarian-language films